Sols may refer to:

The plural of sol (colloid)
Sols (cartoonist) (born 1949), professional name of the Australian cartoonist Alan Salisbury
Standards of Learning, the educational standards in Virginia
Martian days, see Sol (day on Mars)
the Scottish Organisation of Labour Students, a former name for Scottish Labour Students

SoLS may refer to:
TUM School of Life Sciences

See also 
 Sol (disambiguation)